KQYX (1450 AM, "Magic Mix 92.9") is a soft adult contemporary formatted AM radio station licensed to Galena, Kansas and serving the Joplin, Missouri area. It is currently owned by American Media Investment. Dating back to its initial broadcasts in 1927 under its original call sign of WMBH, KQYX is the longest continually operating station in the Joplin area.

FM Translator
An FM translator simulcasts the AM station; this affords listeners the ability to listen on FM with its improved high fidelity sound.  The translator may also improve the station's coverage.

History

KQYX was first licensed on January 10, 1927 as a portable broadcasting station, with the sequentially assigned call letters WMBH, to Edwin Dudley Aber of Chicago, Illinois. Portable stations could be transported from place-to-place on movable platforms such as trucks. They were generally hired out for a few weeks at a time to theaters, mostly located in small midwestern towns that didn't have their own radio stations, to be used for special programs broadcast to the local community. However, if WMBH ever actually toured as a portable its career was brief, because by early June it was reported to be in Joplin, and a government notification reported that it was "no longer portable". After settling in the station adopted the slogan "Where Memories Bring Happiness" based on its call sign.

WMBH's initial studio was located in the Keystone Hotel, with the transmitter at 1334 Roosevelt. In August 1932 Aber transferred ownership of the station to W. M. Robertson. In January 1942, the station spent $5,000 to double its space to 2,000 square feet, moving into new quarters in the lobby of the Frisco Building.

In 1946, WMBH-FM (now KIXQ) went on the air, broadcasting a variety of informative and entertaining programs including the long-running "Quality Hour of Music."

On July 25, 2001, the station engaged in a two-way call letter and format swap, with AM 1450 WMBH receiving the KQYX call letters and a talk radio format, and AM 1560 KQYX becoming WMBH. In early 2009, the community of license was changed from Joplin to nearby Galena, Kansas.

In 2010, KQYX switched to sports as "1450 the Score", using FOX Sports Radio as a source, and became an affiliate of the Oklahoma City Thunder professional basketball team. On February 3, 2014, it adopted its current gospel format, branded as "1450 The Dove".

On December 27, 2022, KQYX changed its format from southern gospel to soft adult contemporary, branded as "Magic Mix 92.9", positioning as "Joplin’s Relaxing Lite Favorites". The first song was "A Million Dreams" by Pink.

Previous logo

References

External links

FCC History Cards for KQYX (covering WMBH for 1927-1980)
Pioneer Broadcaster Award (WMBH 2005) (MSSU.edu)

QYX
Soft adult contemporary radio stations in the United States
Radio stations established in 1927